The 2000 UEFA European Under-21 Championship qualification began in 1998. The final tournament was held in 2000 in Slovakia.

The 47 national teams were divided into nine groups (seven groups of 5 + two groups of 6). The records of the nine group runners-up were then compared. The top seven joined the nine winners in a play-off for the eight finals spots. One of the eight qualifiers was then chosen to host the remaining fixtures.

Qualifying group stage

Draw
The allocation of teams into qualifying groups was based on that of UEFA Euro 2000 qualifying tournament with several changes, reflecting the absence of some nations:
 Groups 1, 2, 3, 5, 8, featured the same nations
 Group 4 did not include Andorra
 Group 6 did not include San Marino, but included Netherlands (who did not participate in senior Euro qualification)
 Group 7 did not include Liechtenstein
 Group 9 did not include Faroe Islands, but included Belgium (who did not participate in senior Euro qualification)

Group 1

 qualified as group winners failed to qualify as one of the best runners-up

Group 2

 qualified as group winners qualified as one of the best runners-up

Group 3

 qualified as group winners failed to qualify as one of the best runners-upGermany (13 pts) and Finland (13 pts) head-to-head record:2–0 in Germany, 3–1 in Finland. Germany is ranked higher on away goals rule.

Group 4

 qualified as group winners qualified as one of the best runners-up

Group 5

 qualified as group winners qualified as one of the best runners-up

Group 6

 qualified as group winners qualified as one of the best runners-up

Group 7

 qualified as group winners qualified as one of the best runners-up

Group 8

 qualified as group winners qualified as one of the best runners-up

Group 9

 qualified as group winners qualified as one of the best runners-up

Ranking of second-placed teams
Because groups contained different number or teams (six and five), matches against the fifth and sixth-placed teams in each group were not included in the ranking. As a result, six matches played by each team counted for the purposes of the second-placed table. The top seven advanced to the play-off.

Play-offs

|}

External links 
 Results Archive at UEFA.com
 RSSSF Results Archive at rsssf.com

 
qualification
Qual
UEFA European Under-21 Championship qualification